Chitchat on the Nile (Adrift on the Nile) is a 1971 film based on the 1966 novel  Adrift on the Nile by Egyptian Nobel Laureate Naguib Mahfouz. The film is a member in Top 100 Egyptian films list.

Plot 

The film addresses the decadence of Egyptian society during the Gamal Abdel Nasser era.

It tells the story of a simple Egyptian civil servant, Anis (played by Emad Hamdi), who cannot tolerate the hypocrisy of the Egyptian government (for whom he works at the Ministry of Health) and the illiteracy of the Egyptian public and decides to hide from all the problems in the country by taking up smoking hashish in a shisha, a popular smoking habit in Egypt, to escape from reality.

Anis (who used to work as a teacher) meets with an old student, Ragab (actor Ahmed Ramzy), by chance. Ragab invites him to the small boat in the Nile. And Anis discovers soon enough that he is not the only person who smokes shisha but a bunch of other elite, middle class and low class people are all on the boat. He soon discovers that everyone is smoking to forget the reality and hypocrisy of Egyptian life.

Political background
The film was released during the era of the government of Anwar Al Sadat and was quickly removed from the market because it was seen as a criticism of the Nasser period, when films that did not conform with Nasser's politics and ideology were often suppressed. Anwar al-Sadat didn't want to upset the Egyptian people, some of whom still loved and respected Nasser.

The films deals frankly with the issue of drug addiction, as well as the decadence that obtained during the late Nasser era. The film was produced in 1971, and was unsuccessful financially, as it was frequently banned in the Middle East and also in the West (mainly Europe). It only gained acclaim thirty-five years later. It is still banned in many countries, especially in the Arab world.

The film is now distributed by Founoon and is subtitled in French and English.

External links 
 

1971 films
1971 comedy-drama films
1970s Arabic-language films
Egyptian black-and-white films
Films based on Egyptian novels
Films directed by Hussein Kamal
Films based on works by Naguib Mahfouz
Egyptian comedy-drama films
Nile in fiction